William Feilding may refer to:
Sir William Feilding (died 1471), Lancastrian and knight of the shire for Leicestershire
William Feilding, 1st Earl of Denbigh (c.1587–1643), English naval officer and courtier
William Feilding, 3rd Earl of Denbigh (1640–1685), grandson of 3rd Earl 
William Feilding (1669–1723), Member of Parliament for Castle Rising 1705–24
William Feilding, Viscount Feilding (1760–1799), British army colonel and politician
William Feilding, 7th Earl of Denbigh (1796–1865), son of William Robert Feilding, Viscount Feilding
William Feilding (British Army officer, born 1836) (1836–1895), British soldier, son of 7th Earl Denbigh
William Feilding, 10th Earl of Denbigh (1912–1966)
William Feilding, 11th Earl of Denbigh (1943–1995), Earl of Denbigh

See also
William Fielding (disambiguation)